Eotitanops ('dawn titan-face') is an extinct genus of brontothere native to North America and Asia.

Eotitanops is the earliest known genus of brontothere. It probably resembled a larger, bulkier version of its contemporary, the horse-like palaeothere Hyracotherium. Like Hyracotherium, it ate leaves and had five-toed front legs and three-toed hind legs.

References 

 

Brontotheres
Eocene odd-toed ungulates
Eocene mammals of North America